The Columbia dune moth (Copablepharon absidum) is a moth of the family Noctuidae. It is found from British Columbia, south through Colorado to California.

References

Noctuinae
Moths of North America